The Yakovlev Yak-11 (NATO reporting name: "Moose") is a trainer aircraft used by the Soviet Air Force and other Soviet-influenced air forces from 1947 until 1962.

Design and development
The Yakovlev design bureau began work on an advanced trainer based on the Yak-3 fighter in mid-1944, although the trainer was of low priority owing to the ongoing Second World War. The first prototype of the new trainer, designated Yak-UTI or Yak-3UTI flew in late 1945. It was based on the radial-powered Yak-3U, but with the new Shvetsov ASh-21 seven-cylinder radial replacing the ASh-82 of the Yak-3U. It used the same all-metal wings as the Yak-3U, with a  fuselage of mixed metal and wood construction. The pilot and observer sat in tandem under a long canopy with separate sliding hoods. A single synchronised UBS 12.7 mm machine gun and wing racks for two 100 kg (220 lb) bombs comprised the aircraft's armament.

An improved prototype flew in 1946, with revised cockpits and a modified engine installation with the engine mounted on shock absorbing mounts. This aircraft passed state testing in October 1946, with production beginning at factories in Saratov and Leningrad in 1947.

Production Yak-11s were heavier than the prototypes, with later batches fitted with non-retractable tailwheels and revised propellers. A 7.62 mm ShKAS machine gun was sometimes fitted instead of the UBS, while some were fitted with rear-view periscopes above the windscreen. Soviet production totalled 3,859 aircraft between 1947 and 1955. with a further  707 licence-built by Let in Czechoslovakia as the C-11.

Yak-11U 
In 1951, Yakovlev revised the design of the Yak-11, adding a retractable tricycle landing gear, with two variants proposed, the Yak-11U basic trainer and Yak-11T proficiency trainer, which carried similar equipment to contemporary jet fighters. The new aircraft had reduced fuel capacity and was unsuitable for operations on rough or snow-covered runways, and so was rejected for Soviet service, although a few examples were built in Czechoslovakia as the C-11U.

Operational history

The Yak-11 entered service in 1947, serving as a standard advanced trainer with the Soviet Air Forces and DOSAAF. Both the Yak-11 and C-11 were used in all Warsaw Pact countries and were exported to eighteen countries, including many African, Middle Eastern and Asian countries.

North Korean Yak-11s were used in combat in the Korean War, with one Yak-11 being the first North Korean aircraft shot down by US forces when it was destroyed by a North American F-82 Twin Mustang over Kimpo Airfield on 27 June 1950.  East Germany used the Yak-11 to intercept American reconnaissance balloons.

Surviving aircraft

Due to its Yak-3 lineage, the Yak-11 has recently seen widespread popularity among warbird enthusiasts. Highly modified versions of the Yak-11 are often seen at air races. About 120 Yak-11s remain airworthy.

Operators

Royal Afghan Air Force received 14 aircraft from 1958. None remain in service since 1999.

Albanian Air Force received four aircraft.

Algerian Air Force

National Air Force of Angola

Austrian Air Force

Bulgarian Air Force

People's Liberation Army Air Force

Czechoslovak Air Force

East German Air Force

Egyptian Air Force

Iraqi Air Force

Hungarian Air Force

Mongolian People's Air Force

North Korean Air Force

Polish Air Force used 101 Soviet Yak-11s and 37 Czech-built C-11s

Romanian Air Force 90

Somali Air Corps – Retired

Soviet Air Force
DOSAAF

Syrian Air Force

Vietnam People's Air Force

Yemen Air Force

Specifications (Yak-11)

See also

Notes

Citations

References

 
 Gordon, Yefim, Dmitry Komissarov and Sergey Komissarov. OKB Yakovlev: A History of the Design Bureau and its Aircraft. Hinkley, UK: Midland Publishing, 2005. .
 Gunston, Bill.  The Osprey Encyclopedia of Russian Aircraft 1975–1995. London, UK: Osprey, 1995. .
 Gunston, Bill and Yefim Gordon. Yakovlev Aircraft since 1924. London, UK: Putnam Aeronautical Books, 1997. .
 Thompson, Warren. "Twin Mustang in Korea". International Air Power Review. Volume 3, Winter 2001/2002. Norwalk, Connecticut, USA:AIRtime Publishing. . . pp. 156–167.

Yak-011
Low-wing aircraft
1940s Soviet military trainer aircraft
Aerobatic aircraft
Single-engined tractor aircraft
Aircraft first flown in 1945